Richard Temple is a 1962 novel by Patrick O'Brian, told in flashback as Temple, a British agent, lies in a Gestapo cell in occupied France. After prolonged torture, the protagonist examines his past life as a painter in London in the 1930s, and describes his early erotic encounters. The novel contains many details of the author's youthful life.

Bibliography
Richard Temple, London: Macmillan, 1962; 
Richard Temple, New York: W.W. Norton & Co., 2006,

References

External links
http://books.wwnorton.com/books/detail.aspx?ID=22592
http://leserglede.com/historical-fiction/patrick-obrian.html
http://www.fantasticfiction.co.uk/o/patrick-obrian/richard-temple.htm
https://www.spectator.co.uk/article/before-the-mast-was-rigged/

1962 British novels
Novels by Patrick O'Brian
English adventure novels
Novels about Nazi Germany
Novels about prisoners of war
William Collins, Sons books